The Cathedral of St. Mary  located in St. Cloud, Minnesota, United States, is the cathedral and parish church in the Catholic Diocese of St. Cloud. The St. Cloud Diocese serves Central Minnesota and a Catholic population of about 150,000.

History

Saint Mary's Church

Saint Mary's Parish was founded in 1855 by the Rev. Francis Xavier Pierz. He celebrated the first Mass in the parish on May 21 in the home of John and Catherina Schwarz. Property was bought for $500 and plans were made for a wood-frame church and a school. In 1856 a Benedictine monk from Saint John's Abbey in Collegeville, Minnesota, became the parish's first pastor and a combination church and school building was built on Eighth Avenue, across the street from the current parish offices. Benedictine nuns from Pennsylvania arrived in 1857 to start the parish school. It was the first school in Stearns County.  They lived in a parishioner's attic until John Tenvoorde rented his "entertainment center" for use as a convent. Six years later they moved to Saint Benedict's Monastery in Saint Joseph, Minnesota. After two years they returned to St. Mary's and continued to teach in the school.

A more permanent and larger Gothic-style church was built for the parish in 1864 at Saint Germain Street and Ninth Avenue. A large rectory and a new school building were built in 1896. A four-story parish center, called Saint Mary's Institute, was built in 1916. The building featured a bowling alley and swimming pool. It was located on Eighth Avenue across the street from the church.

The Gothic-style church burned to the ground in 1920 and construction of the present church building started in 1922.  When the basement was completed, Mass was held there until construction on the upper church ended in 1931. The church was designed after a fifth-century basilica in Ravenna, Italy. The parish's pastor, the Rev. Luke Fink, OSB, attended a Eucharistic Congress in Italy and was inspired by the architecture there. He relayed his plans to a local architect, Nairne W. Fisher, who designed the building.

Cathedral

Holy Angels Cathedral in St. Cloud was severely damaged in a fire in 1933. It was rebuilt without its tall spire, which led Bishop Joseph Francis Busch to desire St. Mary's as his cathedral. In 1937 Pope Pius XI named St. Mary's the cathedral of the St. Cloud Diocese. At that time the Benedictine monks left St. Mary's for St. Augustine parish on the east side of St. Cloud and were replaced by diocesan clergy.

The rectory had fallen into disrepair and was torn down in 1947. The priests moved into the convent and the sisters moved to the top floor of Saint Mary's Institute. Saint Gertrude's School, which educated the mentally disabled, occupied the first floor of the Institute for a time. That building was sold and torn down in 1971.

The cathedral was extensively renovated beginning in 1980 under the direction of Frank Kacmarcik. The pipe organ was installed in the apse and dedicated in 1984. The Mother of Perpetual Help Shrine in the lower church was destroyed in a fire that did extensive damage to the lower church and smoke damage to the upper church. The lower church was renovated to create a chapel for Mass during the week, as well as a Eucharistic chapel and a gathering space. Five terra cotta disks that portrayed the crux gammata or swastika, an ancient stylized cross, were removed from the exterior of the cathedral in 2006. Because of its association with the Nazi Party in Germany, the parish determined the crux gammata could never recover its association with the Cross of Christ. They were replaced by five new limestone disks that depict the Luminous Mysteries that were composed by Pope John Paul II. The cathedral was refurbished in 2013 with a new floor, interior paint, and refurbishing the pews and kneelers.

Shrine of Saint Cloud
Located within St. Mary's is a shrine to Saint Cloud including a number of relics: a piece of St. Cloud's clothing, a bone fragment from Saint Cloud himself and fragments from five other saints. The statue of St. Cloud in the shrine is a replica of a seventeenth-century statue, the oldest known statue of St. Cloud to exist. The hand holding the chalice and the chalice itself are even older, being from the original 8th-century statue. The statue was given to Bishop Joseph Busch in 1922 when he participated in the fourteenth centenary celebration of the birth of St. Cloud in the commune of Saint-Cloud in France. There are also two wood reliefs that flank the statue of St. Cloud. The relief on the left is of St. Clothilde, the grandmother of St. Cloud. The relief on the right is of St. Remigius, Bishop of Rheims, who St. Cloud lived with in his youth.

See also
List of Catholic cathedrals in the United States
List of cathedrals in the United States

References

External links

 Official Cathedral Site
 Diocese of St. Cloud Official Site

Buildings and structures in St. Cloud, Minnesota
Churches in Stearns County, Minnesota
Italianate architecture in Minnesota
Religious organizations established in 1855
Roman Catholic churches completed in 1931
Mary in Saint Cloud
Churches in the Roman Catholic Diocese of Saint Cloud
Tourist attractions in Stearns County, Minnesota
20th-century Roman Catholic church buildings in the United States
Italianate church buildings in the United States